The red pileated finch (Coryphospingus cucullatus), also known as the red-crested finch, is a species of bird in the family Thraupidae. It is found in Argentina, Bolivia, Brazil, Ecuador, French Guiana, Guyana, Paraguay, Peru,  on the eastern side of the Andes.  Its natural habitats are subtropical or tropical dry forests, subtropical or tropical moist lowland forests, subtropical or tropical dry shrubland, and heavily degraded former forest. This is a common species, and the International Union for Conservation of Nature has rated its conservation status as "least concern".

Taxonomy
This species was first described by the German zoologist Philipp Ludwig Statius Müller in 1776. Molecular analysis has shown that along with C.  pileatus, the grey pileated finch, this species belongs in the Thraupidae, the tanager family. The pair form a sister group to a group containing the fulvous-crested tanager, the black-goggled tanager, the shrike tanagers and the grey-headed tanager.

There are three recognised subspecies; C. c. cucullatus from Guyana, Suriname and northeastern Brazil; C. c. fargoi from Peru, Bolivia, western Paraguay and northern Argentina; and C. c. rubescens from Brazil, eastern Paraguay, northeastern Argentina and Uruguay.

Description
Both the male and female have a white eye ring. The male has a red crest and a black crown, just as the grey pileated finch does, however its upper parts are dark wine red, with a reddish rump, and the underparts are a drab reddish colour. The red crest and black head are absent in the female and the upper parts are a little more brown than those of the male. The throat of the female is white and the underparts pink.

Distribution and habitat
This bird has a wide distribution in South America. Its range includes southern Brazil and northern Argentina, extending from Brasília and Rio de Janeiro southwards to Buenos Aires and westwards to the Andean foothills. Besides this main block, there are several isolated populations in dry mountain valleys in Ecuador, Peru and Bolivia, another isolated population in northern Brazil and another in Suriname, Guyana and French Guiana.

Status
C. cucullatus is generally a common species, and its population trend seems to be steady. It has a very extensive range and the International Union for Conservation of Nature has assessed its conservation status as being of "least concern".

References

red pileated finch
Birds of Brazil
Birds of the Guianas
Birds of Peru
Birds of Paraguay
Birds of Uruguay
Birds of Argentina
red pileated finch
Taxonomy articles created by Polbot